Godfrey Mwene Kalimugogo (1943 – 25 January 2015) was a novelist and diplomat from Uganda. He also served as a diplomat, representing Uganda in Tanzania and Ethiopia. He retired from the diplomatic service in 2003.

Early life
Kalimugogo was born in the village of Kyocezo, Kabale District, circa 1943 in south-western Uganda near the Rwandan border.

Education
Kalimugogo was educated at Kihanga Boys' School in Mparo, Rukiga District, from where he went to Nyakasura School in Fort Portal, Kabarole District. He graduated with an honours degree in English and classical literature from Makerere University College of the University of East Africa in 1968. He obtained a postgraduate degree from the University of Dar es Salaam.

Writing
His first book was published in 1972. A number of Kalimugogo's novels focus on the "lifestyle of the greedy hedonist and the ramifications associated with overt love of sex, booze and money".

Kalimugogo's first book, Dare to Die, was released in 1972, but it was his third novel, Trials and Tribulations in Sandu’s Home, released in 1974, that distinguished him as a witty writer. It was put on the literature syllabus. At the time of his death, he had published fifteen books. In 2004 and 2010, respectively, A Visitor Without a Mission and Bury Me in a Simple Grave earned him honours from the National Book Trust of Uganda.

Works

References

External links
Review of Bury Me in a Simple Grave at Uganda's Sunday Monitor newspaper

1943 births
2015 deaths
People from Kabale District
Ugandan novelists
Male novelists
Ugandan male writers
Makerere University alumni
Kumusha
20th-century novelists
University of Dar es Salaam alumni
20th-century male writers